The Courts of Appeal are appellate courts in Cameroon. They are defined in Part V of the constitution of Cameroon as being under the Supreme Court.

Notes

References
 Constitution of the Republic of Cameroon ( English and French versions). 18 January 1996. Accessed 4 January 2007.

Cameroon
Law of Cameroon
Government of Cameroon